The St. Marys River (sometimes spelled St. Mary's River) is a  river in southern Maryland in the United States.

See also
List of Maryland rivers

References

Chesapeake Bay watershed
Tributaries of the Potomac River
Rivers of Maryland
Rivers of St. Mary's County, Maryland
St. Mary's City, Maryland